Christopher John Tallentire (born 11 October 1963) is an Australian politician. He has been a Labor Party member of the Western Australian Legislative Assembly since the 2008 state election, representing Gosnells until 2017 and Thornlie thereafter. Prior to the election, Tallentire was the Director of the Conservation Council of Western Australia from March 2004 to April 2008. He holds a Bachelor of Agribusiness Marketing.

References

|-

1963 births
Living people
Members of the Western Australian Legislative Assembly
Australian Labor Party members of the Parliament of Western Australia
21st-century Australian politicians